Todd P. Graves is a private practice attorney and Republican politician, who previously served as United States Attorney for the Western District of Missouri. A twice-elected state prosecutor who is currently in private practice with the law firm Graves Garrett LLC, his practice focuses on representing individuals and businesses nationwide before federal and state courts and administrative agencies. Graves was born and raised in Tarkio, Missouri. His brother is U.S. Representative Sam Graves. On January 7, 2017, Graves was elected with unanimous support by the Missouri Republican State Committee to serve as Chairman of the Missouri Republican Party.

Notable lawsuits

He filed a lawsuit in May 2014 on behalf of political activist Eric O'Keefe (Wisconsin Club for Growth) against the Government Accountability Board (GAB) in Wisconsin, which captured national media attention, including coverage by The Wall Street Journal. The lawsuit, which also names Kevin Kennedy, the board's executive director and general counsel, asserts that, under Kennedy's direction, the GAB collaborated with five county district attorneys in a secret John Doe investigation of O'Keefe and the Wisconsin Club for Growth. According to the suit, this is in violation of state statutes that restrict GAB to investigations relating to civil violations of campaign laws.

Graves was the first lawyer to file a suit on behalf of a group of Tea Party organizations against the Internal Revenue Service, alleging the IRS engaged in inappropriate "targeting of conservative political groups for extra scrutiny as they sought tax-exempt status", as reported in The Kansas City Star. The lawsuit, pending in the Southern District of Ohio, where most Tea Party applications were initially processed, raises claims of viewpoint-based discrimination and retaliation under the First Amendment.

Business and community involvements
Graves also operates a cattle ranching business near Smithville, Missouri, which has been featured by the Kansas City Business Journal. He also serves as a member of the Board of Directors for Herzog Contracting Corp, a St. Joseph-based railroad and road construction company.

On March 18, 2021, Governor Mike Parson nominated Graves to serve on the University of Missouri Board of Curators from the 6th congressional district. On April 7, 2021, Graves was confirmed to the Board. His term will end on January 1, 2027.

U.S. Attorney
Graves took his oath of office on September 17, 2001, as an interim United States attorney appointed by the U.S. District Court. His appointment was approved by President George W. Bush and confirmed by the United States Senate on October 11, 2001. He initially appeared on a list of 12 U.S. attorneys slated to be dismissed. Seven on that list were dismissed on December 7, 2006.

In April 2007, a Justice Department spokesperson declined to discuss redacted names on the list. He said the Justice Department withheld the names of prosecutors who had been considered for possible dismissal to protect their reputations and "their ability to function effectively as U.S. attorneys or professionals in other roles." On May 9, 2007, Graves disclosed that he had been forced out by the Department of Justice, and had not departed on his own initiative. After resigning from his position as U.S. attorney, Graves formed the law firm of Graves Bartle & Marcus, LLC, which has evolved into the firm Graves Garrett LLC and is based in Kansas City, Missouri.

Years prior to U.S. Attorney service
Graves received an undergraduate degree in agricultural economics, with a minor in political science, from the University of Missouri, and a law degree and a master's degree in public administration from the University of Virginia in 1991.

Right out of law school, Graves was employed as an Assistant Attorney General for the State of Missouri, and served that year as a staff assistant on the Governor's Commission on Crime. From 1992–1994, Graves was in private practice with the law firm of Bryan Cave. In 1994, he was elected as Platte County Prosecuting Attorney (at the time, he was the youngest full-time prosecuting attorney in Missouri), and re-elected in 1998, an office that he held until his U.S. Attorney appointment.

Dismissal of U.S. attorneys controversy

In January 2006, Graves was asked to step down from his job by Michael A. Battle (R), then director of the Justice department's Executive Office for U.S. Attorneys. Graves had clashed with the Department of Justice's civil rights division over a federal lawsuit involving Missouri's voter rolls. The department was pushing for a lawsuit against Missouri, accusing the state of failing to eliminate ineligible people from voter rolls. Graves refused to sign off on the lawsuit, which was subsequently authorized by Graves' successor, Bradley Schlozman (R). In April 2007, a federal judge dismissed the lawsuit.

In October 2008, U.S. Senator (R-MO) Kit Bond apologized to Graves, after a U.S. Justice Department report cited Bond forcing Graves out over a disagreement with Representative Sam Graves (R). Following the report, Attorney General Michael Mukasey appointed a special prosecutor to investigate whether former Attorney General Alberto Gonzales (R) and other officials involved in the firings of nine U.S. attorneys broke the law. Citizens for Responsibility and Ethics in Washington filed an Ethics Committee complaint against Bond over his role in ousting Graves.

Conservative Politics
Graves was unanimously elected to a two-year term as chairman of the Missouri Republican Party in January 2017. His firm is the registered agent of Cornerstone 1791 and Liberty Alliance USA, an organization described by its executive director, Chris Vas, as "formed in order to grow the conservative movement in Missouri now and for decades to come."

Graves serves as President of the Board to the Stanley M. Herzog Foundation, which supports the advancement of Christian education through an endowment of nearly half a billion dollars. The foundation will carry on Stanley Herzog’s mission of supporting education that instills important values like commitment to God, family, and community. The foundation is headquartered in Smithville, Missouri at their 18,000 square foot state-of-the-art training and office facility completed in the summer of 2022.

References

Sources
 Talev, Margaret; Ron Hutcheson and Marisa Taylor (2007-04-27). Administration considered firing 12 U.S. attorneys but cut list down", realcities.com; accessed April 24, 2015.
 David Stout (May 10, 2007). "House "Democrats Raise New Criticism of Gonzales", The New York Times; retrieved May 10, 2007.

External links

Dismissal of U.S. attorneys controversy
Living people
Missouri Republicans
People from Tarkio, Missouri
State political party chairs of Missouri
United States Attorneys for the Western District of Missouri
University of Missouri alumni
University of Virginia School of Law alumni
Year of birth missing (living people)